Philip Allen Bennett (March 5, 1881 – December 7, 1942) was a Republican politician from the state of Missouri. He served as a member of the United States House of Representatives for Missouri's 6th District during the 77th Congress. Prior to that Bennett was the 31st Lieutenant Governor of Missouri and served in the Missouri Senate.

Biography 
Philip A. Bennett was born near Buffalo, Missouri to Marion F. and Mary Jane (O'Bannon) Bennett, the eighth of fourteen children. Following his graduation from Buffalo High School Bennett attended Springfield Normal and Business College (now Missouri State University), earning his degree in 1902. He taught two years in Missouri public schools and worked for the Frisco Railroad before purchasing the Buffalo Reflex newspaper in 1904. Bennett served as the editor and publisher of the Reflex until 1921, when he entered politics full-time. Bennett served as a delegate to the 1912 Republican National Convention. Philip Bennett married Mary B. Tinsley in 1912 and they had two children, a son and a daughter. His son Marion T. Bennett followed in his father's footsteps as a Missouri politician.

In 1920 he was elected to the Missouri Senate. Bennett served only one term because he ran for, and won election as, Missouri lieutenant governor in 1924.  He was not successful in a bid for Missouri Governor in 1928 and returned to the private business sector. Bennett ran for the U.S. House in 1938 and was again defeated. However two years later, in 1940, he was elected to represent the 6th district of Missouri in the U.S. Congress. Reelected in November 1942, Bennett died before he could begin his second term. His son, Marion T. Bennett, completed the term. Philip Bennett died in Washington D.C. on December 7, 1942 shortly before the beginning of his second term in Congress.

See also
 List of United States Congress members who died in office (1900–49)

References

External links

1881 births
1942 deaths
People from Buffalo, Missouri
19th-century American newspaper publishers (people)
Republican Party Missouri state senators
Lieutenant Governors of Missouri
Republican Party members of the United States House of Representatives from Missouri
20th-century American politicians